Alkalicoccus halolimnae is a Gram-positive, cocci-shaped, non-spore-forming and moderately halophilic bacterium from the genus of Alkalicoccus which has been isolated from a from a salt lake in China.

References

Bacillaceae
Bacteria described in 2017